A Flintstone Family Christmas (known in a working title as The Flintstones: Christmas Misdemeanors) is a 1993 animated Christmas television special featuring characters from The Flintstones franchise. It was produced by Hanna-Barbera and aired on ABC on December 18, 1993. The special was nominated for a Primetime Emmy Award in 1994 for Outstanding Animated Program (For Programming Less Than One Hour). This is the only appearance of Stoney and the final appearance of Pebbles and Bamm-Bamm in their adult forms as well as their children, Chip and Roxy. Hanna-Barbera continued doing the series but with the original timeline.

Plot
Fred Flintstone gets into the Christmas spirit by hanging up decorations and being altogether joyful while awaiting the arrival of his daughter Pebbles, her husband Bamm-Bamm and their twin children, daughter Roxy and son Chip. After learning that they will arrive at 4pm, Fred and Barney leave to get their turkeysaurus for dinner. However, on the way back home they are mugged by a Santa. Fred hands over his wallet and watch and orders Barney to give him the bird, but while tossing the turkeysaurus the Santa "breaks" in half. Seizing the opportunity, the two run away from the mugger.

When Fred and Barney get to the police station, they identify the thief, who turns out to be a "caveless" abandoned child named Stoney. According to the social worker, Stoney used to be the horror of foster homes because of his stealing habits. Feeling sympathy for Stoney, Wilma decides to take him in as a ward, despite Fred's initial reluctance. They try to show Stoney that they trust him and attempt to teach him that stealing is wrong.

However, things get slightly bleaker when Pebbles and her family get stuck in an airport because of a blizzard. The Rubbles and the Flintstones then go Christmas tree shopping, but can't afford any that aren't "smaller than their grandchildren". Stoney attempts to help by convincing people to bet on him as he plays a game in order to earn enough money for the Flintstones to buy the tree. When a man loses, he chases Stoney, who runs for cover near Fred. The man claims that Stoney cheated him, and Fred asks if this is true. Stoney then truthfully replies "no", and when Fred believes him, he gets hit in the head with a tree by the man.

Fred then goes to the hospital, but his boss informs him that he can't participate in the Christmas parade (which is something Fred is quite eager to do since the beginning of the movie) and when he tries to protest, his boss finalizes his "no". To make it up to Fred, Stoney poses as his boss's driver and locks him up in the Flintstone's bathroom, which will allow Fred to participate in the parade. Instead, Fred saves his boss and ends up in jail, where he eventually bonds with Stoney. Fred even advises Stoney that cutting corners to get what you want is not the solution. Fred sees Stoney is a good kid. However, the social worker then takes Stoney away and considered to send him back to Juvie, and meanwhile Fred's boss makes him go to the parade. While there, Fred saves Stoney.

At home, Fred sees Pebbles and her family, and Stoney bonds with the twins. Fred says that the new addition to the family gets to put the star on the Christmas tree. Stoney thinks Fred is referring to Roxy and Chip, but it turns out it is him and he becomes a Flintstone. Bamm-Bamm helps him put on the star and they all have a happy Christmas.

Voice cast

Main cast
 Henry Corden as Fred Flintstone
 Jean Vander Pyl as Wilma Flintstone
 Frank Welker as Barney Rubble, Dino
 B.J. Ward as Betty Rubble
 John Stephenson as Mr. Slate
 Christine Cavanaugh as Stoney
 Didi Conn as Stella
 Megan Mullally as Pebbles Flintstone-Rubble
 Jerry Houser as Bamm-Bamm Rubble

Additional voice cast

 Charlie Adler
 Hamilton Camp
 Nick Jameson
 Megan Mullally
 Robert Ridgely

 Kath Soucie
 John Stephenson
 Jean Vander Pyl
 Alan Young

Home media
A Flintstone Family Christmas was originally released on VHS by Turner Home Entertainment in the Cartoon Network Video line on September 24, 1996, entitled The Flintstones: Christmas in Bedrock.

On September 27, 2011, Warner Home Video's Warner Archive released A Flintstone Family Christmas on DVD in region 1 via their Hanna–Barbera Classics Collection, in a release entitled A Flintstone Christmas Collection. This is a Manufacture-on-Demand (MOD) release, available exclusively through Warner's online store and Amazon.com. The special received an HD restoration when it was released on HBO Max.

Other media
A hardcover storybook adaptation - A Very Special Flintstones' Family Christmas by Lisa Ann Marsoli based on the teleplay written by Sean Roche and David Ehrman - was released by Turner Publishing on October 1, 1993.

Production credits
 Executive Producers: William Hanna, Joseph Barbera
 Teleplay by: Sean Roche, David Ehrman
 Directed by: Ray Patterson
 Produced by: Larry Huber
 Storyboard by: David Feiss
 Recording Director: Gordon Hunt
 Casting Director: Kris Zimmerman
 Talent Coordinator: Jill Ziegenhagen
 Supervising Recording Engineer: Edwin Collins
 Voices: Charlie Adler, Hamilton Camp, Christine Cavanaugh, Didi Conn, Henry Corden, Nick Jameson, Megan Mullally, Robert Ridgely, Kath Soucie, John Stephenson, Jean Vander Pyl, B.J. Ward, Frank Welker, Alan Young
 Design Supervisor: Scott Jeralds
 Designers: Bwana, Julian Chaney, Eric Clark, Scott Hill, Jim Stenstrum
 Design Assistants: Dana Jo Granger, Barbera D. Krueger
 Background Supervisor: Al Gmuer
 Background Layout Keys: Bill Proctor, Ron Roesch
 Background: Ruben Chavez, Leonardo Robledo, Patricia Palmer-Phillipson, Joseph Binggeli, Jerry Loveland
 Graphics: Tom Wogatzke
 Music by: Steven Bramson
 "Christmas Bedrock" Music & Lyrics by: Paul Hussbaum
 Director of Music Production: Bodie Chandler
 Ink & Paint Supervisor: Alison Leopold
 Color Key: Suzette Darling
 Xerography: Star Wirth
 Animation Checking Supervisor: Jan Adams
 Animation Checking: Beth Goodwin
 Post Production Supervisor: Tom Gleason
 Supervising Editor: Pat Foley
 Post Production Coordinator: Jeannine Roussel
 Sound Editors: Cecil Broughton, Jerry Winicki
 Music Editor: Liz Lachman
 Track Readers: Jim Hearn, Kay Douglas, Carol Iverson
 Re-Recording Mixer: James Aicholtz, C.A.S.
 Production Executive: Catherine Winder
 Program Executive: Jeff Holder
 Unit Production Coordinator: Tori Pollock
 Production Supervisor: Debby Hindman
 Production Assistants: Sylvia Edwards, Sandy Benenati, Valerie Menk, Linda Moore, Gail Prewitt, Margaret Roberts, Ginger Robertson
 Animation by: Fil-Cartoons, Inc., Philippines
 Overseas Production Supervisor: Jerry Smith
 Overseas Layout Supervisor: Margaret Parkes
 Overseas Animation Director: Chris Cuddington

Follow-up film
A Flintstones Christmas Carol was released in 1994.

References

External links
 
 

1993 television specials
1990s animated television specials
The Flintstones television specials
Hanna-Barbera television specials
American Broadcasting Company television specials
1990s American television specials
Christmas television specials
Films scored by Steven Bramson
Films directed by Ray Patterson (animator)
American Christmas television specials
Animated Christmas television specials